

Abruka Lighthouse (Estonian: Abruka tagumine tuletorn) is a lighthouse located on the island of Abruka, in the region of Saaremaa in western Estonia.

The first lighthouse in Abruka was built in 1897, a  wooden structure, which had a form of a trellised wooden candelabrum. The current lighthouse was built in 1931, replacing the former wooden structure; the current lighthouse was designed by engineer Ferdinand Adoff, and constructed by Arronet and Boustedt. The lighthouse is 36 metres high, but only 2 metres in diameter, with its cylindrical reinforced concrete structure painted white with three black bands.

See also 

 List of lighthouses in Estonia

References

External links 

 

Lighthouses completed in 1931
Resort architecture in Estonia
Lighthouses in Estonia
Saaremaa Parish
Buildings and structures in Saare County
Lighthouses completed in 1897